Rubus lineatus (syn. R. pulcherrimus) is a semi-evergreen shrub belonging to the raspberry and blackberry genus Rubus. It is native to eastern and southern Asia, in China (Xizang, Yunnan), Bhutan, north east India (Sikkim), Indonesia, Malaysia, Myanmar, Nepal and north Vietnam. It is also cultivated as an ornamental for temperate climates. It spreads by suckering stems.

Small white flowers in spring and summer are followed by red or yellow ornamental fruits in autumn. Full sun is required for the fruits to ripen.

The Latin specific epithet lineatus ("lined" or "striped") refers to the deep veining of the leaves.

References

lineatus
Flora of China
Flora of tropical Asia